Eleanor Matsuura is a British actress best known for her roles as Yumiko in The Walking Dead, Hannah Santo in Spooks: The Greater Good, Bev in Utopia and as PC Donna Prager in Cuffs.

Early life
Matsuura was born in Tokyo and raised in Hertfordshire, England. She is of half-English and half-Japanese descent and does not speak Japanese. She was trained at the Central School of Speech and Drama in London and graduated in 2004. She is trained in modern and period dance.

Career 
Matsuura worked on stage at the Royal Court Theatre, Old Vic Theatre and several West End theatres. She has also appeared in several British TV dramas, including EastEnders, Thorne, Extras, Holby City, Lead Balloon, Doctor Who and Hustle; and in British films. In 2015 she appeared as Isobel in Bull at the Crucible Theatre, Sheffield.

Matsuura is in the fourth series of the hit BBC One drama series Sherlock, playing the role of Detective Inspector Hopkins. She has done voice acting for video games such as Mass Effect: Andromeda and Dreamfall Chapters.
She portrays Yumiko on the hit TV show The Walking Dead based on the comic book of the same name.

Personal life 
Matsuura is an animal rights supporter and works closely with the Battersea Dogs and Cats Home.

Matsuura married Canadian actor Trevor White in 2014. They live in London. In November 2017, Matsuura gave birth to a baby girl, the couple's first child.

Filmography

Film

Television

Video games

References

External links 
 
 Profile Eleanor Matsuura

1983 births
Living people
Actresses from Tokyo
Actresses from London
Actresses of Japanese descent
Alumni of the Royal Central School of Speech and Drama
English film actresses
English people of Japanese descent
English television actresses
English video game actresses
English voice actresses
Japanese emigrants to the United Kingdom
Japanese people of English descent
Place of birth missing (living people)
21st-century English actresses
British actresses of Japanese descent